Mickey Rowe is an autistic and legally blind author of the award-winning book Fearlessly Different: An Autistic Actor's Journey to Broadway's Biggest Stage and the first autistic actor to play the lead role in the play The Curious Incident of the Dog in the Night-Time. He was the Founding Artistic Director of the National Disability Theatre.

Biography 
Mickey grew up in Seattle and studied drama at the University of Washington. He performed as an actor at the Gershwin Theater, Syracuse Stage and Indiana Repertory Theatre, he is also a public speaker and was the founding artistic director of National Disability Theatre.

Mickey is the first autistic actor to have played Christopher Boone in the play The Curious Incident of the Dog in the Night-Time in 2017 This made Mickey one of the first openly autistic actors to play an autistic character. He landed the title role in the play Amadeus.

He wrote the award-winning book Fearlessly Different: An Autistic Actor's Journey to Broadway's Biggest Stage.

Mickey and his wife Helen provide DEIA trainings and workshops for companies including Nordstrom, Pfizer, BrightHouse, Metropolitan Opera, Lincoln Center for the Performing Arts, New York City Ballet.

Awards 
D-30 Disability Impact List honoree 2022 (incredible leaders with disabilities).

LitHubs Best Audio Books of April 

AudioFile's Earphone Award Winner for best Audio Book 

Pathfinder Award for highest alumni honor in 2021.

Syracuse Area Live Theater (SALT) Award for Leading Actor in a Play in 2018.

Winner of the 2017 Christopher Reeve Scholarship, Media Access Awards.

Stage Directors and Choreographers Society's (SDC) Top Ten “Standout Moments” recognition 2017–2018.

References 

Blind artists
Living people
1988 births